Oscar Hammerstein II Farm, also known as the Highland Farm, is a historic home and farm in Doylestown, Bucks County, Pennsylvania. The farmhouse was built in 1840, and is a three-story, three bay, stuccoed masonry residence with a hipped roof.  It features a one-story wraparound porch.  A decorative balustrade was added in 1954.  Also on the property is a contributing bank barn.  Lyricist Oscar Hammerstein II (1895–1960) purchased the farm in 1940 and died there on August 23, 1960.

It was added to the National Register of Historic Places in 1988.

References

External links
The Oscar Hammerstein Museum and Theatre Education Center

1840 establishments in Pennsylvania
Houses completed in 1840
Houses on the National Register of Historic Places in Pennsylvania
Houses in Bucks County, Pennsylvania
National Register of Historic Places in Bucks County, Pennsylvania